Gulab Singh Saini was an Indian freedom fighter and commander-in-chief of the army of princely state of Ballabhgarh. He led the army of Ballabhgarh state in the Indian Rebellion of 1857 and was hanged on 9 January 1858 in Delhi's Chandni Chowk along with two other leaders of the mutiny.

Early life 

He was the son of Jodh Singh Saini.  His ancestors were close associates of Raja Nahar Singh's family for many generations and Gulab Singh's forefathers traditionally held the ranks of army chief successively in this predominantly Jat principality. Gulab Singh Saini's father, Jodh Singh, was also the 'senapati', or commander-in-chief,  of Ballabhgarh's army during the time of Raja Ram Singh, who was Nahar Singh's father. Raja Nahar Singh is said to have received all of his military training from Jodh Singh, and later Jodh Singh's son, Gulab Singh, was appointed as the 'senapati' or the  army chief upon the coronation of Nahar Singh as the Raja of Ballabhgarh.

Role in 1857 mutiny 

According to B.P. Dheeraj, a correspondent of Punjab Kesari, Gulab Singh Saini took a stand against the English army in the village of Sihi. He led a composite army which consisted of  Muslims, Jats, Sainis, Meos and a lot of other soldiers of Rajput extractions. On 10 May 1857 Gulab Singh and his native army inflicted a crushing defeat on the army of East India Company and forced them to retreat. This campaign was undertaken to prevent the English army's entry into Delhi to dethrone Bahadur Shah Zafar, the last nominal Mughal emperor of India. Due to Gulab Singh's efforts there English temporarily failed in accomplishing this and this allowed Bahadur Shah Zafar to be crowned again as the emperor of India  and the nominal leader of the Indian Rebellion of 1857 by a congress of Indian rulers.

Capture and execution 

Gulab Singh Saini was hanged, along with Nahar Singh and Madho Singh,  in the Chandni Chowk of New Delhi on 9 January 1858 after they had been allegedly captured by deception by English forces. Thereupon, all of his property and land was confiscated by the British colonialists and all public records pertaining to him and his companions were burnt down to erase the influence of their martyrdom on the natives.

References 
 

1858 deaths
Indian revolutionaries
Punjabi people
Executed Indian people
People executed by British India by hanging
Indian independence activists from Haryana
People from Faridabad district
Year of birth unknown